The following outline is provided as an overview of and topical guide to Venice:

Venice – city in northeastern Italy and the capital of the Veneto region. It is situated across a group of 118 small islands that are separated by canals and linked by bridges, of which there are 400. The islands are located in the shallow Venetian Lagoon, an enclosed bay that lies between the mouths of the Po and the Piave Rivers. Parts of Venice are renowned for the beauty of their settings, their architecture, and artwork. The lagoon and a part of the city are listed as a World Heritage Site. The Republic of Venice was a major financial and maritime power during the Middle Ages and Renaissance, and a staging area for the Crusades and the Battle of Lepanto, as well as a very important center of commerce (especially silk, grain, and spice) and art in the 13th century up to the end of the 17th century. The City State of Venice is considered to have been the first real international financial center which gradually emerged from the 9th century to its peak in the 14th century. This made Venice a wealthy city throughout most of its history.

General reference 

 Common English name(s): Venice
 Official English name(s): City of Venice
 Adjectival(s): Venetian
 Demonym(s): Venetian

Geography of Venice 

Geography of Venice
 Venice is:
 a city
 Capital of Veneto
 Population of Venice: 
 Area of Venice:  
 Atlas of Venice

Location of Venice 

 Venice is situated within the following regions:
 Northern Hemisphere and Eastern Hemisphere
 Eurasia
 Europe (outline)
 Western Europe
 Southern Europe
 Italian Peninsula
 Italy (outline)
 Northern Italy
 Northeast Italy
 Veneto
 Time zone(s):

Environment of Venice 

 Climate of Venice

Areas of Venice 

 Districts of Venice

Locations in Venice

Historic locations in Venice 

 Venetian Arsenal
 Bridge of Sighs
 Ca' d'Oro
 Ca' Foscari
 Ca' Pesaro
 Ca' Rezzonico
 Ca' Vendramin Calergi
 Doge's Palace
 Gallerie dell'Accademia
 Grand Canal
 Punta della Dogana
 Il Redentore
 Rialto Bridge
 Church of San Giorgio Maggiore
 Santa Maria della Salute
 Santa Maria Gloriosa dei Frari
 Santi Giovanni e Paolo, Venice
 St Mark's Basilica

Demographics of Venice 

Demographics of Venice

Government and politics of Venice 
Government and politics of Venice
 Government of Venice
 Council of Venice
 List of mayors of Venice

History of Venice 

History of the city of Venice
 Timeline of Venice
 Venice Time Machine

Culture of Venice 

Culture of Venice
 Cuisine of Venice
 Symbols of Venice
 Flag of Venice
 People of Venice

Architecture of Venice 

Architecture of Venice
 Venetian Renaissance architecture
 List of buildings and structures in Venice
 List of bridges in Venice
 List of churches in Venice
 List of palaces in Venice
 List of theatres and opera houses in Venice

Art in Venice 

 Cinema in Venice
 Venice International Film Festival
 Music of Venice

Religion in Venice 

 Christianity in Venice
 Catholicism in Venice
 Roman Catholic Archdiocese of Venice
 Judaism in Venice
 History of the Jews in Venice

Sports in Venice 

Sports in Venice
 Running in Venice
 Venice Marathon

Economy and infrastructure of Venice 

Economy of Venice

Transportation in Venice 

Transportation in Venice
 List of bridges in Venice
 Port of Venice

Education in Venice 

Education in Venice
 Public education in Venice
 Colleges and universities in Venice
 University of Venice
 Conservatorio di Musica Benedetto Marcello di Venezia
 Francesco Morosini Naval Military School
 Università Iuav di Venezia
 Venice International University
 Studium Generale Marcianum

See also 

 Outline of geography

References

External links 

Venice
Venice